This is a list of the members of the 20th Seanad Éireann, the upper house of the Oireachtas (legislature) of Ireland. These Senators were elected or appointed in 1993, after the 1992 general election and served until the close of poll for the 21st Seanad in 1997.

Composition of the 20th Seanad 
There are a total of 60 seats in the Seanad. 43 Senators are elected by the Vocational panels, 6 elected by the Universities and 11 are nominated by the Taoiseach.

The following table shows the composition by party when the 20th Seanad first met on 17 February 1993.

List of senators

Changes

See also 
Members of the 27th Dáil
23rd Government of Ireland
24th Government of Ireland

Sources

References

External links 

 
20